Tagtabazar (formerly Panjdeh or Pendi) is the capital town of Tagtabazar District in the Mary Province of Turkmenistan.

See also
Panjdeh incident

References

Populated places in Mary Region